The University of Queensland Cricket Club is a cricket club on the University of Queensland, Queensland, Australia. The club plays in the Queensland Premier Cricket competition. It was founded in 1911.

Past students of the University of Queensland who were members of the cricket club include-

 Clem Jones
 William Edward Pender (WEP) Harris
 George Corones
 Owen Lloyd
 Ken Archer
 Tom Veivers
 John Biggs
 David Ogilvie
 Bob Crane
 Bob Mihell
 Lew Cooper
 Martin Love
 Michael Kasprowicz
 Wade Seccombe

The main oval for the club is the WEP Harris Oval.

See also

References

External links
 

Queensland District Cricket clubs
Sport at the University of Queensland
University and college sports clubs in Australia
Cricket clubs established in 1911
1911 establishments in Australia
Sporting clubs in Brisbane